The 1955 Paris–Tours was the 49th edition of the Paris–Tours cycle race and was held on 9 October 1955. The race started in Paris and finished in Tours. The race was won by Jacques Dupont.

General classification

References

1955 in French sport
1955
1955 Challenge Desgrange-Colombo
October 1955 sports events in Europe